is a Japanese footballer who plays as a midfielder for Vissel Kobe in the J1 League, on loan from Shonan Bellmare. He played as a defensive midfielder early in his career.

Career
Mitsuki Saito was promoted to top team from youth team of J1 League club Shonan Bellmare in 2016. He scored his first goal for the club on a 2-1 loss against V-Varen Nagasaki at the group stage of the 2018 J.League Cup.

On 14 December 2020, he joined Russian Premier League club FC Rubin Kazan on a 1.5-year loan with an option to purchase. On 16 February 2021 he was operated on due to an injury to ankle tendons, recovery was expected to last 4 months, he was not able to play for Rubin in the 2020–21 season. Upon his recovery from injury, he made his debut for Rubin on 12 August 2021 in a Europa Conference League qualifier against the Polish club Raków Częstochowa. He substituted Hwang In-beom in the 106th minute in the extra time, as Rubin lost 0–1 and were eliminated from the competition. He made his RPL debut for Rubin on 22 August 2021 in a game against FC Khimki, he substituted Darko Jevtić in the 81st minute. On 31 August 2021, he was removed from Rubin's RPL squad once again.

On 7 January 2022, he joined Gamba Osaka on loan until 31 January 2023.

Career statistics
Updated to 18 February 2019.

References

External links

Shonan Bellmare 

1999 births
Living people
Association football people from Kanagawa Prefecture
Japanese footballers
Japan youth international footballers
Association football midfielders
Shonan Bellmare players
FC Rubin Kazan players
Gamba Osaka players
J1 League players
J2 League players
Russian Premier League players
Japanese expatriate footballers
Expatriate footballers in Russia
Japanese expatriate sportspeople in Russia
Vissel Kobe players